The Last Man is a 2006 Lebanese film by the Lebanese director Ghassan Salhab.

The film was presented in Cannes 2007 during the Tous les cinemas du monde section.  Carlos Chahine won the Best actor prize for his role at the Singapore International Film Festival 2007.

Synopsis
Khalil (Carlos Chahine), a doctor who works at an hospital, is strangely linked to victims of a serial killer who leaves them without blood.

Cast and characters
Carlos Chahine as Khalil
 Faek Homaissi as Dr. Labib

External links
 

2006 films
2006 comedy-drama films
2000s Arabic-language films
Films directed by Ghassan Salhab
Lebanese comedy-drama films
2006 comedy films
2006 drama films